Giuliano Cesarini the Younger (It.: Giuliano Cesarini, iuniore; 1466–1510) was an Italian Roman Catholic cardinal.

Biography

Giuliano Cesarini, iuniore was born in Rome in 1466, the son of Gabriele Cesarini, Gonfaloniere of the Senate and Roman People (SPQR), and his wife Giulina (Godina). Her father was Giovanni Andrea Colonna, and her mother was Ambroscina de'Astalli. Giuliano had two brothers, Pietro Paolo and Giovanni Giorgio. Giovanni Giorgio succeeded his father as Gonfaloniere in 1499. A third brother, Giovanni Andrea, was married to Gerolama Borgia, daughter of Pope Alexander VI, but both spouses died in 1483. They were the grand-nephews of Cardinal Giuliano Cesarini, seniore. Giuliano also had four sisters: Antonina (wife of Carlo Muti), Caterina (wife of Antonino Albertoni), Alteria (who married a Margana), and Livia (wife of Pietro Ludovico Capizucchi).

Early in his life, he was a protonotary apostolic, and a canon of the cathedral chapter of St. Peter's Basilica (attested between 1490 and 1493). On March 13, 1491, Giuliano was a canon of the chapter of St. Lambert's Cathedral, Liège.

Cardinal
In the consistory of September 20, 1493, Pope Alexander VI created Cesarini a cardinal deacon.  He received the red hat and the deaconry of Santi Sergio e Bacco on September 23, 1493. Cardinal Cesarini lived in a palazzo in the Pigna region of the city of Rome, which had been reconstructed from several family houses by his great-uncle, Cardinal Giuliano Cesarini, seniore.

King Charles VIII of France, who was on his way to Naples, entered Rome with his army on 31 December 1494. Cardinals Colonna, Savelli, Peraudi, de la Grolaie, Sanseverino, Lunati, and della Rovere were with him. He was met privately ahead of time by Joannes Burchard, the papal Master of Ceremonies, who briefed the King on protocol, but Charles wanted a quiet entry without pomp. Cardinal Sforza came out to meet the King, and he was greeted by Cardinal Cibò at the Milvian Bridge (Ponte Mollo). On January 2, 1495, the King received all of the cardinals at the Palazzo San Marco, where he was lodged, with the exception of Carafa and Orsini, who were in attendance upon the Pope. The cardinals were received coldly by the King, and without the customary honors. Cesarini visited Charles after dinner and was admitted by the Duke of Albany, and he and the king walked up and back together. It is possible that he was carrying a private message directly from Pope Alexander. On May 27, 1495, Cesarini and nineteen other cardinals accompanied Pope Alexander VI to Civitavecchia, then Orvieto, and then Perugia, in order to avoid problems that might arise from the visit to Rome of King Charles VIII of France, who was returning from his war against Naples. The Curia returned to Rome with him on June 27, 1495.

On 13 February 1500, Bishop Prospero Caffarelli of Ascoli was buried at the Minerva in Rome. On the next day, February 14, 1500, Cesarini became apostolic administrator of the see of Ascoli Piceno a post he held until his death. On 20 February, Cardinal Cesarini's majordomo, Bishop Antonio Bavano of Parenzo, died of the plague. The papal Master of Ceremonies, Johannes Burchard, notes in his Diary that he knew neither where nor how he was buried, since his padrone "was lacking in all goodness and humanity."

On 26 February 1500, there was a grand reception of the Duke Valentino (Cesare Borgia) at the Porta del Popolo and a festive procession through the city to the Vatican. The Pope awaited his son in the loggia above the entrance to the Vatican Palace, in the company of Cardinal Juan de Borja, Cardinal Giovanni de San Giorgio, Cardinal Juan Lopez, Cardinal Cesarino, and Cardinal Alessandro Farnese. Cesarini also participated in a similar ornamental capacity in the investiture of Duke Valentino as Gonfaloniere of the Holy Roman Church and the award of the Golden Rose on Laetare Sunday, 29 March 1500. On Holy Thursday, 17 April 1500, Cesarini read out the papal bull granting a plenary indulgence on the occasion, and on Easter Sunday at the Papal Solemn Mass he had the privilege of reading the Latin Gospel—a task traditionally assigned to a deacon.

On March 5, 1503, Cardinal Giuliano Cesarini became archpriest of the Basilica di Santa Maria Maggiore.

Conclaves
Cardinal Cesarini participated in the papal conclave of September 1503 that elected Pope Pius III. The principal problem during the Sede Vacante that led up to the opening of the Conclave on 16 September was that of security. There was a French army descending on Rome, and at the same time a Neapolitan army was approaching from the South. Cesare Borgia was in command of a force of 12,000 troops, mostly Spanish, who occupied the Leonine City (Vatican area). Most Cardinals refused to approach the Papal Palace while Cesare was in charge, and were actually negotiating with the Castellan of the Castel S. Angelo to use that fortress as a secure place to hold the Conclave. On 28 August Cardinal Cesarini was sent along with Cardinals Carvajal, Vera, and Medici to persuade the Castellan to hand over the keys. The Castellan refused, in accordance with his sworn oath to hand over the fortress only to the new pope. Cesare, who in the meantime had decided to switch to the French side, was finally persuaded to vacate the Papal Palace and remove his troops. As he was departing for Monte Mario on 2 September, and passing through the Garden Gate (Porta Vineae extra Portam Viridarii), he was accosted by Cardinal Cesarini, his sister's brother-in-law, who wanted to speak with Cesare. The reply given him was that "The Duke is not granting an audience." Cesarini could only return to the business meetings of the Cardinals and the contemplation of the possible future of the supporters of the Borgia. The Conclave opened on 16 September, but no vote was taken until 21 September. Cesarini voted for Della Rovere and Piccolomini. Then some concentrated negotiation produced a substantial and successful two-thirds majority for Cardinal Francesco Tedeschini-Piccolomini of Siena on 22 September. He chose the name Pius III. Piccolomini's brother was married to the illegitimate daughter of Ferdinando I of Naples. The French had lost. But temperamentally Piccolomini was a temporizer, and the French hopes revived when Pius III granted Charles VIII permission to march his troops through Rome toward Naples.

The death of Pius III after only twenty-six days on the papal throne gave everyone a second chance. Cesarini then participated in the papal conclave of October 1503 that elected Pope Julius II. There was no ballot. Della Rovere was elected by acclamation on the morning of 1 November.

On November 29, 1503, Cardinal Cesarini opted for the deaconry of Sant'Angelo in Pescheria.

He died in Rome on May 1, 1510. Paris de Grassis, the Papal Master of Ceremonies provided a comment at his death: .  He is buried in Santa Maria in Aracoeli.

References

Bibliography

Eubel, Conradus (1913) (W. Gulik ed.). Hierarchia catholica medii aevi, sive Summorum pontificum, S.R.E. cardinalium, ecclesiarum antistitum series, editio altera, Tomus II (Monasterii 1913). (in Latin)
 Pastor, Ludwig von (1902).  The History of the Popes, from the close of the Middle Ages, third edition, Volume V Saint Louis: B. Herder 1902.
 Pastor, Ludwig von. The History of the Popes, from the close of the Middle Ages, second edition, Volume VI Saint Louis: B. Herder 1902.
 Rosini, Patrizia (2016). Famiglia Cesarini: Ricerche e documenti Lulu 2016. (self-published, on-line). Retrieved: 2017-09-02.

External links

Petrucci, Franca (1980). "CESARINI, Giuliano." Dizionario Biografico degli Italiani Volume 24 (1980)

1466 births
1510 deaths
16th-century Italian cardinals
Cardinals created by Pope Alexander VI
15th-century Italian cardinals